Leptodactylus melanonotus is a species of frog in the family Leptodactylidae.
It is found in Central America.
Its natural habitats are subtropical or tropical dry forests, subtropical or tropical moist lowland forests, subtropical or tropical mangrove forests, subtropical or tropical moist montane forests, dry savanna, moist savanna, subtropical or tropical seasonally wet or flooded lowland grassland, intermittent freshwater lakes, freshwater marshes, intermittent freshwater marshes, pastureland, plantations, rural gardens, urban areas, heavily degraded former forest, water storage areas, ponds, and canals and ditches.

References

melanonotus
Frogs of North America
Amphibians of Belize
Amphibians of Colombia
Amphibians of Costa Rica
Amphibians of Ecuador
Amphibians of El Salvador
Amphibians of Guatemala
Amphibians of Honduras
Amphibians of Mexico
Amphibians of Nicaragua
Amphibians of Panama
Taxonomy articles created by Polbot
Amphibians described in 1861